The Lutheran Council in the United States of America was an ecumenical organization of American Lutherans that existed from 1967 to 1988. Succeeding the National Lutheran Council, it was founded by four Lutheran church bodies: the Lutheran Church in America, the American Lutheran Church, the Lutheran Church–Missouri Synod, and the Synod of Evangelical Lutheran Churches.

References

Lutheranism in the United States
Lutheran organizations
Religious organizations disestablished in 1988
Christian organizations established in 1967